Internal lateral ligament may refer to:

 Ulnar carpal collateral ligament
 Ulnar collateral ligament of elbow joint